Rivière Blanche/Cardinal Aviation Water Aerodrome  is an aerodrome located on the Rivière Blanche, north of Gatineau, Quebec, Canada.

See also
 List of airports in the Ottawa area

References

Registered aerodromes in Outaouais
Seaplane bases in Quebec
Transport in Gatineau